The Virginia Monologues is the second compilation album by American dark cabaret band The Dresden Dolls, released in April 2015 on Record Store Day. It is a three-LP vinyl compilation of the albums Yes, Virginia... (2006) and No, Virginia... (2008). This release marks the first time Yes, Virginia... was put out on vinyl. Three different color LPs are housed in a tri-pocket, book-like gate-fold jacket. The release run was limited to 9000 copies.

Track listing

Personnel
Amanda Palmer - vocals, piano, Mellotron, and organ.
Brian Viglione - drums, percussion, vocals, bass guitar, and guitar.
Sean Slade, Paul Q. Kolderie, and The Dresden Dolls - producers
Benny Grotto, Paul Q. Kolderie, Sean Slade - mixer
Paul Q. Kolderie, Benny Grotto, Adam Taylor - engineering
Holly Brewer and Matt McNiss - choir
Holly Brewer, Whitney Moses, and Mali Sastri - Backing vocals on 'Delilah'
George Marino - mastering

References

The Dresden Dolls albums
2015 compilation albums
Rhino Records compilation albums
Albums produced by Paul Q. Kolderie
Albums produced by Sean Slade